Titanic was an ocean liner that struck an iceberg and sank in the North Atlantic Ocean in 1912.

Titanic may also refer to:

Arts, entertainment, and media

Films  

Titanic (1915 film), a silent Italian film unrelated to the RMS Titanic disaster
Titanic (1943 film), a German film by Werner Klingler
Titanic (1953 film), a film by Jean Negulesco
S.O.S. Titanic, a 1979 British-American film by William Hale
Titanic (1997 film), a film by James Cameron
Titanic: The Legend Goes On, a 2000 Italian animated film
Titanic II (film), a 2010 film
Titanic 666, a 2022 horror film
Titanic Kadhalum Kavundhu Pogum, a Tamil-language film

Games
Hidden Expedition: Titanic (2010), an app developed by Big Fish Games  

Starship Titanic (1998), a computer game designed by Douglas Adams and produced by The Digital Village
Titanic: Adventure Out of Time, a 1996 computer game developed by Cyberflix
Titanic: Honor and Glory (TBA), developed by Vintage Digital Revival
Titanic: The Board Game (1998), a board game designed by Sandra Gentry and Valen Brost and published by Universal Games

Music

Albums
Titanic (Nautilus Pompilius album), a 1994 album by Nautilus Pompilius
Titanic (Mark Seymour album), a 2007 album by Mark Seymour
Titanic, a 1982 album by Francesco De Gregori
RMS Titanic, a 2016 soundtrack album by Adam Young of Owl City
Titanic: Music from the Motion Picture, a soundtrack album from the 1997 film

Songs
"Titanic" (Falco song), a song by Falco from Nachtflug
"Titanic", a song by Frederik
"Titanic", a song by Goodnight Mr. Mackenzie from their album Five
"Titanic", a song by Juice WRLD from his album Legends Never Die
"Titanic", a song by Robin Schulz from his album Sugar
"The Titanic" (song), an American folk song

Other uses in music
Titanic (band), a Norwegian rock band
"Titanic", a method used in change ringing; when on 11 bells called "Titanic cinques" (pronounced "sinks")
Titanic Records, an American record label

Television
Titanic (1996 miniseries), an American-Canadian television miniseries
Titanic (2012 TV series), a British-Canadian-Hungarian television drama
Titanic: Blood and Steel (2012), a 12-part television costume drama series about the construction of the RMS Titanic

Other uses in arts, entertainment, and media
Titanic (magazine), a German satirical magazine
Titanic (musical), a 1997 Broadway musical
Titanic (play), a 1974 play by Christopher Durang
 Titanic, a fictitious luxury space liner on "Voyage of the Damned", a 2007 episode of Doctor Who

Brands and enterprises 
RMS Titanic Inc., company with salvor-in-possession rights to the wreck which displays the salvaged wreck pieces around the world 
Titanic Brewery, a UK producer of beer in Burslem, near Stoke-on-Trent

People 
Titanic Sinclair (born 1987), stage name of musician Corry Michael Mixter
Titanic Thompson (1892–1974), American gambler, golfer, and hustler
Jinx Titanic (born 1968), American singer-songwriter
Morris Titanic (born 1953), retired NHL ice hockey player with the Buffalo Sabres
"Titanic", nickname of Salman Raduyev, Chechen warlord

Places 
Titanic, Oklahoma, United States
Titanic, Saskatchewan, Canada
Titanic Quarter, Belfast, Northern Ireland

Science and technology
Titanic acid, a chemical compound

Ships 
 , a cargo ship
 MY Titanic, named after the RMS Titanic
 Replica Titanic, the concept of creating a modern replica of the RMS Titanic
Titanic II, a proposed replica of the original Titanic 
Romandisea Titanic, a replica under construction in Sichuan, China

See also 
 Halomonas titanicae, the Titanic rusticle bacteria 
 Itanic, a derisive nickname for the Intel Itanium processor
 Sinking of the Titanic (disambiguation)
 Titan (disambiguation)
 Titanium (disambiguation)